Two-time defending champion Dylan Alcott defeated Sam Schröder in the final, 6–4, 6–2 to win the quad singles wheelchair tennis title at the 2021 French Open. It was the second step towards an eventual Golden Slam for Alcott.

Seeds

Draw

Finals

References

 Draw

Wheelchair Quad Singles
French Open, 2021 Quad Singles